Audignicourt is a commune in the department of Aisne in the Hauts-de-France region of northern France.

Geography
Audignicourt is located some 20 km southeast of Noyon and 20 km northwest of Soissons. It can be accessed on the D563L road from Nampcel in the west and continuing east to Vassens. The D650 road also serves the commune and village branching off the D935 in the north. The southern and western borders of the commune are also the border between the departments of Aisne and Oise.

The commune is traversed by the Ru de Moulins stream from west to east and the commune is quite extensively forested around an extended area surrounding the stream. The rest of the commune is farmland with no other hamlets or villages.

Neighbouring communes and villages

Administration

List of Successive Mayors of Audignicourt

Population

See also
Communes of the Aisne department

References

External links
Audignicourt on the old IGN website 
Audignicourt on Géoportail, National Geographic Institute (IGN) website 
Audignecourt on the 1750 Cassini Map

Communes of Aisne